Myosides seriehispidus is a species of weevil native to Asia. It is triploid and reproduces via parthenogenesis.  Since the year 2000 it has been found in United States  and Canada.

References

Beetles of Asia
Beetles described in 1873
Curculionidae